Tim Cresswell (born 1965) is a British human geographer and poet. Cresswell is the Ogilvie Professor of Human Geography at the University of Edinburgh having formally served as the Dean of the Faculty and Vice President for Academic Affairs at Trinity College, Hartford, Connecticut.

Background
Cresswell was an 'airforce kid' and was educated at Woolverstone Hall School near Ipswich, a boarding school founded by London County Council (it closed in 1990). He studied geography at University College London and a PhD at University of Wisconsin Madison (1986-1992) that was later made into a book (Cresswell, 1996). He spent most of the early part of his career teaching geography in Wales, at University of Wales, Lampeter before the well-known Geography Department was closed, and University of Wales Aberystwyth (1999?-2006), before moving to Royal Holloway (until 2013: he also has a second PhD in creative writing from the university). From 2013-2016 he held an interdisciplinary professorship at Northeastern University in Boston, before moving into an administrative role as Dean and VP at a private liberal arts college, Trinity College in Hartford, CT. He resigned in 2019 to move back into research as the Ogilvie Chair at the University of Edinburgh.

Contributions

Cresswell is the author of six books on the role of place and mobility in cultural life, co-editor of four collections and an inaugural managing editor of the journal, "GeoHumanities". Cresswell is a leading figure in the mobilities paradigm. In general, he explores the cultures of mobility and its implications for particular places.

He is also a poet and the author of three collections published by Penned in the Margins "Soil" (2013), "Fence" (2015) and "Plastiglomerate" (2020). "Fence" was a result of Cresswell's participation in the artist Alex Hartley's nowhere island project.

Publications
(2022) Muybridge and Mobility (co-written with John Ott and in introduction by Anthony W. Lee)
(2021) Moving Towards Transition: Commoning Mobility for a Low Carbon Future (co-written with Peter Adey, Jane Yeonjae Lee, Anna Nikolaeva, Andre Novoa, Cristina Temenos)
(2020) Plastiglomerate (poetry)
(2019) Maxwell Street: Thinking and Writing Place
(2015) "Ne pas dépasser la ligne! Fabrique des identités et contrôle du mouvement dans les lieux de transit (with Geraldine Lay and Mikaël Lemarchand)
(2015) Fence (poetry)
(2014) Place: An Introduction (Second Edition)
(2013) Soil (poetry)
(2013) Geographic Thought: A Critical Introduction
(2012) Geographies of Mobilities: Practices, Spaces, Subjects (co-edited with Peter Merriman)
(2008) Gendered Mobilities (co-edited with Tanu Priya Uteng)
(2006) On the Move: Mobility in the Modern World
(2004) Place: A Short Introduction
(2002) Mobilizing Place, Placing Mobility (co-edited with Ginette Verstraete)
(2002) Engaging Film: Geographies of Mobility and Identity (co-edited with Deborah Dixon)
(2001) The Tramp in America
(1996) In Place/Out of Place: Geography, Ideology and Transgression University of Minnesota Press

See also
Human geography
Geography of media and communication
Lampeter Geography School

References

British expatriate academics in the United States
Living people
University of Wisconsin–Madison alumni
British geographers
Academics of Royal Holloway, University of London
Northeastern University faculty
Alumni of University College London
Academics of the University of Wales, Lampeter
Academics of Aberystwyth University
1965 births